The Grand Theater in Norfolk in Madison County, Nebraska was built in 1920, had a seating capacity of 1,081, and cost about $80,000 to construct.  It was listed on the National Register of Historic Places in 2013.

It was the city of Norfolk's first purpose-built movie theater when constructed in 1920.

The theater was closed during 1930–34, perhaps as result of the 1927 opening of the opulent Granada Theater, with an auditorium seating 1,100.

The theater was available for sale in February 2017.

References

External links

Theatres on the National Register of Historic Places in Nebraska
National Register of Historic Places in Madison County, Nebraska
Theatres completed in 1920